The Son is a 2019 Bosnian drama film directed by Ines Tanović. It was selected as the Bosnian entry for the Best International Feature Film at the 92nd Academy Awards, but it was not nominated.

Plot
Adopted 18-year-old Arman's struggles with his identity affect his younger stepbrother Dado, which leads Dado into drug addiction.

Cast
 Dino Bajrović as Arman
 Snežana Bogdanović 
 Uliks Fehmiu
 Emir Hadžihafizbegović

See also
 List of submissions to the 92nd Academy Awards for Best International Feature Film
 List of Bosnian submissions for the Academy Award for Best International Feature Film

References

External links
 

2019 films
2019 drama films
Bosnian-language films
Bosnia and Herzegovina drama films